Energy cycles are based on the fact that in physics, energy is conserved and may in particular refer to:
Solar–hydrogen energy cycle
Lorenz energy cycle
In a wider sense energy cycle may refer to the following engineering fields:
Energy recycling
Energy recovery